Pensioners Party was an English political party for pensioners. The leader was Roger Edwards.

They contested two European Parliament elections: in 2004, they stood in the West Midlands, receiving 33,501 votes (2.3%, 0.1% behind Respect); they stood in the South West in 2009, campaigning for non means-tested index linked state pensions, immigration control, replacing council tax with a local income tax, and keeping Imperial units and the Pound. They received 37,785 votes (2.4%). They deregistered as a party in 2013.

See also
Senior Citizens Party
Scottish Senior Citizens Unity Party

References 

Pensioners' parties
Defunct political parties in England
Political parties established in 2004
2004 establishments in England
2013 disestablishments in England
Political parties disestablished in 2013